Bang Krathum station is a railway station located in Bang Krathum Subdistrict, Bang Krathum District, Phitsanulok. It is located 362.225 km from Bangkok Railway Station and is a class 2 railway station. It is on the Northern Line of the State Railway of Thailand. The station opened on 24 January 1908 as part of the Northern Line extension from Pak Nam Pho to Phitsanulok.

Train services
 Rapid 102 Chiang Mai-Bangkok
 Rapid 105/106 Bangkok-Sila At-Bangkok
 Rapid 109 Bangkok-Chiang Mai
 Rapid 111/112 Bangkok-Den Chai-Bangkok
 Ordinary 201/202 Bangkok-Phitsanulok-Bangkok
 Local 401/402 Lop Buri-Phitsanulok-Lop Buri
 Local 407/408 Nakhon Sawan-Chiang Mai-Nakhon Sawan

References

 
 

Railway stations in Thailand
Railway stations opened in 1908